Robert William Sandeman Strachan (21 May 1886 – 30 June 1927) was an Australian rules footballer who played for  in the Victorian Football League (VFL). After attending Scotch College in Melbourne, Strachan joined Collingwood in 1904. Between 1904 and 1910 he played 52 VFL matches, including the 1905 Grand Final. Strachan died in Marble Bar, Western Australia in June 1927 after the fuel tank in his car exploded.

References

1886 births
1927 deaths
Collingwood Football Club players
Australian rules footballers from Melbourne
Accidental deaths in Western Australia
Australian military personnel of World War I
Military personnel from Melbourne
People educated at Scotch College, Melbourne